German rapper Capital Bra has released one video album and more than 30 music videos.

Video albums

Music videos

As featured artist

References

Videographies of German artists